John Hanbury Martin (4 April 1890 – 3 February 1983) was a British Labour politician.

Martin was educated at Wellington College and Brasenose College, Oxford, before becoming an author and journalist.  During World War I, he served as a captain in the Queen's Westminsters.  At the 1931 United Kingdom general election, he stood unsuccessfully for the Labour Party in Great Yarmouth, and from 1934 until 1949, he served on Southwark Borough Council.

In 1934, he married Avice Blanaid Trench, daughter of Herbert Trench, but they were divorced in 1938.

He was elected Member of Parliament (MP) for Southwark Central in 1940, resigning in 1948. In 1951, he married Dorothy Helen Lloyd-Jones.

References

External links 
 

1890 births
1983 deaths
Alumni of Brasenose College, Oxford
People educated at Wellington College, Berkshire
British Army personnel of World War I
Queen's Westminsters officers
Labour Party (UK) MPs for English constituencies
UK MPs 1935–1945
UK MPs 1945–1950